Rauno Ruotsalainen (born 4 February 1938) is a Finnish footballer. He played in six matches for the Finland national football team from 1962 to 1965.

References

1938 births
Living people
Finnish footballers
Finland international footballers
Place of birth missing (living people)
Association footballers not categorized by position